Dichocrocis bimaculalis is a species of moth of the family Crambidae. It is found in Papua New Guinea.

It has a wingspan of 31mm.

References

Moths described in 1907
Spilomelinae